Tshepo Motaung (born 9 August 1999) is a South African cricketer. He made his List A debut for Easterns in the 2016–17 CSA Provincial One-Day Challenge on 9 October 2016 and his first-class debut for Easterns in the 2016–17 Sunfoil 3-Day Cup on 6 October 2016.

References

External links
 

1999 births
Living people
South African cricketers
Easterns cricketers
Place of birth missing (living people)